was a town located in Shizunai District, Hidaka Subprefecture, Hokkaido, Japan.

As of 2004, the town had an estimated population of 22,581 and a density of 28.17 persons per km2. The total area was 801.51 km2.

On March 31, 2006, Shizunai was merged with the town of Mitsuishi (from Mitsuishi District) to create the new town of Shinhidaka (in the newly created Hidaka District).

It was the most populous town and was the economic center of Hidaka Subprefecture. Nijikken-dōro (二十間道路, lit. road 36 meter in width), the avenue of cherry blossoms, was a major tourist attraction of the town.

Climate

References

External links

Shinhidaka official website 

Dissolved municipalities of Hokkaido
Shinhidaka, Hokkaido